Ritiati was a settlement on a Nikumaroro atoll in Kiribati.

See also
 Noriti

References

Populated places in Kiribati